The B.C. (British Columbia) roll is a Maki-zushi (roll), a kind of sushi containing barbecued salmon and cucumber. It is prepared as an uramaki roll, a style of sushi in which the rice is on the outside. Often the roll contains barbecued salmon skin coated in a sweet sauce. There are many variations of this roll including barbecued salmon skin with mayo.

The name comes from the fact that British Columbia is famous for wild Pacific salmon. Many sushi restaurants in B.C. serve the B.C. roll as a part of their menu. The Vancouver-based Japanese chef Hidekazu Tojo created the B.C. roll in 1974 when he used salmon skin in place of the traditional anago (salt-water eel), which was difficult to obtain in the West Coast.

References

American fusion cuisine
Cuisine of British Columbia
Salmon dishes
Sushi in the United States